Sinpyong Ho clan is one of the Korean clans. Their Bon-gwan is in Dangjin, South Chungcheong Province. According to the research held in 1985, the number of the Sinpyong Ho clan was 3529. The founder was  who was naturalized in Korea. Before that, he participated in the war named Japanese invasions of Korea (1592–98) as a vice general. He was served under Li Rusong, and he made some achievement during the war.

See also 
 Korean clan names of foreign origin

References

External links 
 

 
Korean clan names of Chinese origin
Ho clans
Japanese invasions of Korea (1592–1598)